The eleventh season of the long-running Australian medical drama All Saints began airing on 12 February 2008 and concluded on 25 November 2008 with a total of 40 episodes.

Plot 
The 11th season opens with the majority of the team held hostage in the Emergency Department at gunpoint, the hospital's pathology lab exploding and a drug robbery underway. This is the All Saints team at its best, with patients to keep alive while their own safety is at risk. The siege unlocks a memory Von Ryan has managed to keep buried for decades and must now deal with. Despite this, Von is supportive when Bart West falls deeply in love with a woman whom he diagnoses with cancer and then later dies. Mike Vlasek donates a kidney to his son and must deal with post-op pain when he can't have morphine. A volatile triangle is formed between Steve Taylor, Gabrielle Jaeger, and Jack Quade with the men coming to blows when personal agendas spill into the professional arena. And finally Dan Goldman and Erica Templeton provide us with the first All Saints wedding since 2003.

By the end of Season 11, when the fights have been fought and won, when newlyweds are beginning their lives together, when the ED family is settled and closer than ever, Admin has been given money to launch a full trauma unit that will introduce new characters to the mix.

Cast

Main cast 
 John Howard as Frank Campion
 Tammy Macintosh as Charlotte Beaumont
 Judith McGrath as Von Ryan
 Mark Priestley as Dan Goldman (until episode 39)
 Wil Traval as Jack Quade (until episode 39)
 Jolene Anderson as Erica Templeton (until episode 32)
 Allison Cratchley as Zoe Gallagher (until episode 20)
 Andrew Supanz as Bartholomew West
 Virginia Gay as Gabrielle Jaeger
 Jack Campbell as Steve Taylor
 Kip Gamblin as Adam Rossi (from episode 36)
 Ella Scott Lynch as Claire Anderson (from episode 37)
 Alix Bidstrup as Amy Fielding (from episode 26)
 John Waters as Mike Vlasek

Recurring cast 
 Celeste Barber as Bree Matthews (22 episodes)
 Mike Smith as Heath Velaga (13 episodes)
 Renee Lim as Suzi Lau (11 episodes)
 Petra Yared as Rhiannon Wilson (11 episodes)
 Nicholas Bell as Oliver Maroney (8 episodes)
 Yael Stone as Ann-Maree Preston (7 episodes)
 Robert Jago as Luke Goldman (7 episodes)
 Genevieve Hegney as Juliet Martin (7 episodes)
 Sonia Todd as Elizabeth Foy (5 episodes)
 Penny Cook as Rhonda Goldman (5 episodes)

Guest cast 
 Tracy Mann as Laura McDermott (3 episodes)
 Alexandra Davies as Cate McMasters (2 episodes)
 Wendy Strehlow as Lorraine Tanner (2 episodes)
 Will Snow as Simon McDermott (2 episodes)
 Nathaniel Dean as James Byrne (2 episodes)
 Leslie Dayman as Kevin Goldman (1 episode)

Death of Mark Priestley 
Actor Mark Priestley, who played Dan Goldman on the show, took his own life on 27 August 2008. As a result, the show's final two episodes had to be re-filmed. It is presumed that the nature of these episodes, in which Mark's on-screen wife goes missing, led Mark to suicide. The Seven Network paid tribute with a video clip in the following episode, along with actor John Howard in a plea to all those with depression to get help.

As a result of Mark's death, the on-screen wife, played by Jolene Anderson who had already been absent from his last seven episodes (including the penultimate episode in which he only appeared in the first half), was killed off in the show as Jolene believed she could not go on playing the role. Mark's final episode was aired on 18 November.

Controversy 
The Seven Network faced potential legal action after the airing of episode 432, "Never Tell" on 27 May 2008. The episode suggested that children with Down Syndrome are a result of incestuous relationships, provoking advocacy group Down Syndrome Australia to lodge a complaint with the Human Rights and Equal Opportunity Commission and the Australian Communications and Media Authority, insisting that major advertisers in the show's timeslot boycott it and asking for a public apology from Seven. In the episode, a brother and sister are told that their unborn child is at risk of developing Down Syndrome as a result of their sexual relationship – according to Down Syndrome Australia, there is no evidence to support such a claim:

Seven responded with an apology through a newspaper on 2 June.

Down Syndrome Australia rejected the apology on 3 June, saying that the Seven Network's response was insufficient.:

Episodes

References 

General
 Zuk, T. All Saints Series 11 episode guide, Australian Television Information Archive. Retrieved 15 July 2008.
 TV.com editors. All Saints Episode Guide – Season 11, TV.com. Retrieved 15 July 2008.
Specific

All Saints (TV series) seasons
2008 Australian television seasons